Nicole Colaco (born April 9, 1970 in Mombasa, Kenya) is a former field hockey player from Canada.

Colaco earned a total number of 51 international caps for the Canadian Women's National Team during her career. At the national level the Kenya-born midfielder, a resident of Scarborough, Ontario, played for G.O.A.

International senior tournaments
 1993 – World Cup Qualifier, Philadelphia, United States (3rd)
 1994 – World Cup, Dublin, Ireland (10th)
 1995 – Pan American Games, Mar del Plata, Argentina (3rd)
 1995 – Olympic Qualifier, Cape Town, South Africa (7th)
 1997 – World Cup Qualifier, Harare, Zimbabwe (11th)

External links
 Profile on Field Hockey Canada

1970 births
Living people
Female field hockey midfielders
Canadian female field hockey players
Field hockey players from Toronto
Kenyan emigrants to Canada
Naturalized citizens of Canada
Sportspeople from Mombasa
Sportspeople from Scarborough, Toronto
Pan American Games medalists in field hockey
Pan American Games bronze medalists for Canada
Field hockey players at the 1995 Pan American Games
Medalists at the 1995 Pan American Games